You Benchang (born 16 September 1933) is a Chinese actor.

You is noted for his roles as Ji Gong in the television series Ji Gong, which earned him a Best Actor Award at the 4th Golden Eagle Awards.

Early life and education
You was born in Taizhou, Jiangsu on September 16, 1933, and primarily studied in Shanghai and Nanjing. When he was a child, a fortune teller said that he could not live to be 13 years old unless he became a monk. So when he was 6 years old, his parents sent him to Fazang Temple in Shanghai, where he received ordination as a monk under Master Xingci. And he got the dharma name "Chengpei".

In 1951, You joined the Nanjing Song and Dance Troupe after high school. You entered Shanghai Theatre Academy in 1952, majoring in acting.

Career
After graduating in 1956 he was assigned to the National Theatre Company of China as an actor.

You joined the Chinese Dramatists Association in 1980.

In 1984, You performed a famous pantomime named Shower in the annual CCTV New Year's Gala.

You first rose to prominence in 1986 for playing Ji Gong in the television series Ji Gong. The series reached number one in the ratings when it aired in China.

In 2009, You had a minor role as Tang Pangzi in The Butcher, the Chef and the Swordsman, which starred Masanobu Andō as Yaba.

You participated in many films, such as Reign of Assassins, The University Days of a Dog, and Painted Skin: The Resurrection.

In 1994, You founded the Beijing Benchang Movie & TV Cultural Co., Ltd.

On July 28, 2009, You became a monk at the Great Light Temple, in Suifenhe, Heilongjiang.

In 2021, he made a guest appearance as a Buddhist monk on the comedy film Lie Detector.

Filmography

Film

Television

Awards

References

Bibliography

External links

1933 births
People from Taizhou, Jiangsu
Shanghai Theatre Academy alumni
Male actors from Jiangsu
Living people
Chinese male television actors
Chinese male film actors